(born 1944) is a Japanese percussionist in the tradition of traditional Japanese dance and drama, the sixth iemoto (head) of the Tōsha school. He specializes in the taiko and tsuzumi, and performs as a member or leader of the hayashi (musical accompanists) in the kabuki theatre, as well as in a variety of other traditional contexts.

Born in 1944, his father was the 4th Tōsha Rosen. He began studying percussion under his father at the age of six, focusing upon the ko-tsuzumi, a small hand-drum. He later studied taiko under the 5th Tōsha Rosen, nagauta shamisen under Kondō Chōjūrō II, Kondō Ayako, and Kineya Katsuroku, and kiyomoto-bushi under Kiyomoto Jukuni-tayū.

He made his first appearance on stage in 1954, at the Kyoto Gion Kaburenjō (Song and Dance Practice Hall), under the name Tōsha Toshiaki. He then took up the name Tōsha Naritoshi in 1968, and made his kabuki debut in April the following year, performing for the dance piece Renjishi at the Kabuki-za in Tokyo. He succeeded to the name Tōsha Rosen, and the position as iemoto of the school, in September 1986.

Discography

Notes

References

 Alt URL

Japanese drummers
1944 births
Living people
Kabuki musicians